
"Until the End of Time" is a dance song by the English duo Electronic. It first appeared on their second album Raise the Pressure in 1996 and then on a fan club CD the following year. It was composed by members Johnny Marr and Bernard Sumner with guesting writer Karl Bartos.

The track is mainly programmed and played with synthesizers. Denise Johnson provides backing vocals. James Spencer is credited with engineering and mixing on the single, although Alan Meyerson is listed as the mixer in the album sleevenotes.

Single release
At one point it was intended as the second single from Raise the Pressure, but ultimately it became available as a CD of remixes in late 1997. It was obtained by posting a yellow sheet (which was mailed to people who had sent away a card that came with British copies of "Forbidden City" and Raise the Pressure) together with a payment of £5.

A limited run of 5000 was made, meaning that the item is now very rare. A 12-inch release, housed in a plain black sleeve, is even harder to find, especially given that the band name is absent from the label.

Three outside teams remixed the track: K-Klass, Richie Santana ("Sweet Dub") and Soulboy Collective, while Sumner contributed his own version ("Fluffy Dice Remix"). Johnny Marr added electric guitar to the version by K-Klass. Richie Birkett and Brian Kierulf play additional keyboards on the "K-Klassic" and "Sweet Dub" versions respectively.

Bernard Sumner claimed that seeing Kate Moss dancing to this song in London was a proud moment.

In September 2007 the four remixes were made available on iTunes.

Reception
Given the low-key release of the single, "Until the End of Time" was only reviewed in the context of Raise the Pressure. In Mojo magazine Barney Hoskyns wrote: "The languorous melancholy of Sumner's best work with New Order [is] sorely missing here. Instead we're treated to the drab whiteboy electro-funk of 'Second Nature' and the squiggling acid house synths of 'Until the End of Time', with its collish mantra".

In Q Tom Doyle stated: "There are other moments, such as in 'Until the End of Time', where a high energy backbeat collides with Johnson belting out a 'You’re driving me crazy... oh baby' refrain, and it really is unclear exactly what the duo are on, such is their purposeful labouring of the cliché".

Track listing
 K-Klassic Mix – 7:48
 Fluffy Dice Remix – 5:36
 Sweet Dub – 6:37
 Soulboy Collective 7" Version – 4:40
 The 12-inch issue used the following titles: 12" mix, 12" version, dub mix and 7" mix.

References

External links
 feel every beat (unofficial website)
 worldinmotion.net (unofficial website)

1996 songs
Electronic (band) songs
1997 singles
Songs written by Bernard Sumner
Songs written by Karl Bartos
Songs written by Johnny Marr
Parlophone singles